Maurea simulans is a species of sea snail, a marine gastropod mollusk, in the family Calliostomatidae within the superfamily Trochoidea, the top snails, turban snails and their allies.

Description
It is a light greyish colour with white dots on its body. It looks like a regular snail in the sense that its shell is a spiral shape.  It is 57mm tall and 53mm wide.

Distribution
This marine species occurs off New Zealand, off the coast of New Plymouth, Cape Palliser south to the Banks Peninsula. It is also found on Chatham Rise and off Bounty and Campbell Island; also off Western Australia.

Habitat
It makes its home in the mud and lives in its shell for all of its life.

References

 Smith, E.A. 1899. Notes on some marine shells from northwest Australia, with descriptions of new species. Proceedings of the Malacological Society of London 3: 311-314 
 Hedley, C. 1916. A preliminary index of the Mollusca of Western Australia. Journal and Proceedings of the Royal Society of Western Australia 1: 152-226
 Marshall, 1995. A revision of the recent Calliostoma species of New Zealand (Mollusca:Gastropoda:Trochoidea). The Nautilus 108(4):83–127

External links
 Jansen, P. 2000. A preliminary checklist of the recent Australian Trochidae

Calliostomatidae
Gastropods described in 1994